Abraham Edward Barit (August 30, 1890 – July 14, 1974) was an American industrialist who served as the president and CEO of the Hudson Motor Car Company from 1936 to 1954 when Hudson merged with Nash Motors to form American Motors Corporation.  Barit served on the board of AMC following the merger of the two automakers.

Career 
Barit was born to poor parents in Jersey City, New Jersey. He was briefly the secretary for the purchasing agent at the Chalmers-Detroit Motor Company.  He began his career with Hudson in 1910, by joining the firm's purchasing department, less than six months after the production of the company's first automobile. He was a stenographer, and had no flair for market analysis, product development, nor design.

Barit was named president and CEO of Hudson following the death of the corporation's founding president and CEO Roy D. Chapin in 1936.

Using lines of credit arranged for Chapin prior to his death, Barit helped to steer Hudson back towards profitability in the late 1930s. Sales of Hudson rebounded through the economic recession of 1938. The company also survived a negative financial year in 1941, recouping its loss through World War II production contracts. In 1945, Barit successfully fought off a below market rate tender offer for Hudson Motors by the Fisher family—founders of General Motors Fisher Body division.

The conservative Barit gave the go-ahead for Hudson's step-down body design—a revolutionary design that catapulted the firm to the forefront of automotive body engineering in the postwar market. When combined with the firm's Twin-H straight-6, Hudson's corporate sponsored race teams, headed by Marshall Teague, dominated the NASCAR circuit from 1951 through 1954.

In the early 1950s, instead of reshaping Hudson's aging step-down design, or investing in V8 engine technology, Barit instead guided the company toward developing a compact car that Hudson could market. He "meddled" in the development and design of the company's products, failing to capitalize on the expertise of the firm's professionals in those areas. Instead of relying on engineering and styling to duplicate the previous success of the step-down design, Barit imposed his own requirements for chair high seating, and allowed others outside of Hudson to influence the design, namely Chicago, Illinois Hudson dealer Jim Moran, whose dealership became number one sales outlet for Hudson, accounting for about 5% of Hudson's total production. Moran fancied the 1952 Ford's wrap around rear window and roofline, and influenced Barit to introduce a similar design for the Jet. The final result was that the Jet's styling closely mimicked the larger 1952-1954 Ford in many respects which emerged as the antithesis of the low-slung step-down bodies.

The new compact car, named the Hudson Jet, did not attract buyers, and the expense of its development (and failure) combined with Hudson's lack of resources to update their senior line of cars spelled the end for the company. Hudson Motors was subsequently acquired through a friendly merger by Nash Motors in 1954, creating American Motors.

Barit served on the board of AMC until 1956 when he resigned in protest over the likelihood that Hudson would be phased out of production. Barit felt that his trust in AMC had been betrayed. George W. Romney, AMC's president, felt that Hudson and Nash were no longer relevant players in the automotive market and retired both names at the end of the 1957 model year production to make way for the new Rambler brand.

According to his son, Robert Barit, the last car that A. E. Barit owned was a Hudson, and after it was retired, he refused to own any other make of automobile.

A. E. Barit died at his home in Grosse Pointe Park, Michigan, on July 14, 1974.

Footnotes

External links

Sources
 "Business: Happy Days". Editors. Time, April 5, 1948.
 
 
 Social Security Death Index, Barit, Abraham E.

1890 births
1974 deaths
American chief executives of manufacturing companies
American chief executives in the automobile industry
American Motors people
Nash Motors people
Hudson Motor Car Company
People from Jersey City, New Jersey
People from Grosse Pointe Park, Michigan